Conlin McCabe (born August 20, 1990) is a Canadian rower. He won a silver medal at the 2012 Olympic games and two gold medals at the 2015 Pan American Games.

Born in Brockville, Ontario, McCabe rowed for the University of Washington from 2009 to 2013 (after taking a year off for the Olympics), helping the Huskies win three national championships. McCabe majored in Geography while at Washington. He also came in first at the 2011 CRASH-B Sprints, a 2000-metre indoor rowing race with a time of 5:48.0. This made McCabe the first Canadian to ever win a CRASH-B competition in the Men's Open category.

McCabe's international racing career started at the World Rowing Junior Championships. He placed fourth in the coxed pair in 2006 and won a silver medal in the coxless pair in 2007 with Anthony Jacob. McCabe went on to compete at two Under-23 World Championships, winning a silver in 2010 in the coxless pair (also with Jacob) and finishing fourth in the coxless four in 2009.

He won a silver medal at the 2012 Summer Olympics in the men's eight with Andrew Byrnes, Gabriel Bergen, Jeremiah Brown, Will Crothers, Douglas Csima, Robert Gibson, Malcolm Howard and Brian Price.

In 2016 McCabe competed on Canada's 2016 Olympic team in the Coxless Four which placed 6th overall.

McCabe competed at the 2020 Summer Olympics.

References

External links
 

1990 births
Living people
Canadian male rowers
Rowers at the 2012 Summer Olympics
Olympic rowers of Canada
Olympic medalists in rowing
Olympic silver medalists for Canada
Medalists at the 2012 Summer Olympics
Sportspeople from Brockville
Washington Huskies men's rowers
Rowers at the 2015 Pan American Games
World Rowing Championships medalists for Canada
Sportspeople from Ontario
Pan American Games gold medalists for Canada
Rowers at the 2016 Summer Olympics
Pan American Games medalists in rowing
Medalists at the 2015 Pan American Games
Rowers at the 2020 Summer Olympics